Maple Avenue (In German: Ahornallee) was a German soap opera television series which ran between April and June 2007 on RTL. The series focused on a woman after the death of the father of her two children, who, plagued by financial worries, moves to the big city of Düsseldorf to start a new life. The series was discontinued due to low ratings.

See also
List of German television series

External links
 

German television soap operas
2007 German television series debuts
2007 German television series endings
RTL (German TV channel) original programming
German-language television shows